Alexander Prass (born 26 May 2001) is an Austrian professional footballer who plays as a midfielder for Asutrian Bundesliga club Sturm Graz and the Austria national team.

Club career
On 28 May 2021, Prass signed a three-year contract with Sturm Graz.

Career statistics

Club

International

References

External links 

2001 births 
Living people
Austrian footballers
Austria youth international footballers
Austria under-21 international footballers
Association football midfielders
FC Liefering players
SK Sturm Graz players
2. Liga (Austria) players
Austrian Football Bundesliga players